The Chinese FA Super Cup, formerly named Chinese Football Super Cup, is a pre-season football competition held before the season begins in China. It is a Chinese football championship contested by the winners of top division of Professional League (former Chinese Jia-A League, now Chinese Super League) and the FA Cup last season. If both teams are the same, the opponent is the runners-up of league last season. It is the Chinese equivalent to the English FA Community Shield, in which the winners of the Premier League and FA Cup compete for the trophy. It was created in 1995 but was not held between 2004 and 2011.

The most successful club is Guangzhou with four titles.

Winners 
The winner is typed in bold.

: If both the league and the FA Cup is won by the same team, the opponent is the runner-up of the league.
: Two-legged match.

Titles by team

References

External links
China List of Super Cup Winners, RSSSF.com

Super Cup
China
Recurring sporting events established in 1995